Xylota atroparva is a species of hoverfly in the family Syrphidae.

Distribution
Sri Lanka.

References

Eristalinae
Insects described in 1974
Diptera of Asia